Münster is a German surname.

 Alexander Münster (1858–1922), German aristocrat
 Amalie Münster (1767–1814), Danish courtier, translator and poet
 Eleonore von Münster (1734 – 26 March 1794), German noblewoman, writer, and lay musician
 Ernst zu Münster (1766–1839), German statesman in the service of the House of Hanover
 Count Georg zu Münster (1776–1844), German paleontologist
 Georg Herbert Münster (1820–1902), German statesman
 Hermann von Münster (c. 1330–1392), German master glassmaker
 Johannes Münster (died 1544), Auxiliary Bishop of Mainz
 Leopold Münster (1920–1944), Luftwaffe ace and recipient of the Knight's Cross of the Iron Cross with Oak Leaves
 Mia Münster (1894–1970), German artist
 Reinhard Münster (director) (born 1955), German film director
 Sebastian Münster (1488–1552), German cartographer, cosmographer, Hebraist and lexicographer

German-language surnames